Walter Pym (7 April 1905– 22 January 1980) was an Australian actor and producer best known for his extensive experience in radio, during the 1940s and 1950s, in 1938, he became the studio and production manager at 3UZ, he featured in film and television appearances, making his screen debut in 1943.
He was born in the Sydney suburb of Petersham in 1905 and died in Prahran, Melbourne, aged 74 in 1980, he was married to Ivy Ray from 1928 until 1963, and had one son.

Selected filmography
South West Pacific (1943)
 Against the Wind (1978)
 Patrick (1978 film)

External links
Walter Pym at National Film and Sound Archive

Australian male radio actors
1905 births
1980 deaths
20th-century Australian male actors
Male actors from Sydney